Hamilton Branch State Park is located near the town of Plum Branch in McCormick County. It sits on a 731-acre peninsula in Lake Strom Thurmond. The park became part of the South Carolina State Park Service in 1972, with land leased from the United States Army Corps of Engineers.

Amenities in the park include lakefront camping sites, picnic shelters, a playground and two boat ramps for access to the lake. The park office sells limited supplies and souvenirs and also rents out a number of games for guests. A short bike trail provides access to the Steven's Creek Bike Trail. The park is a popular spot for geocaching, fishing and bird watching.

External links
Official Website

References

State parks of South Carolina
Protected areas of McCormick County, South Carolina